Vitaly Orlov may refer to:

 Vitaly Orlov (rugby union), Ukrainian rugby union player
  (1923–2014); see List of Heroes of the Soviet Union (O)
 A Russian co-owner of the company Ocean Trawlers later known as Norebo
 A Russian professor at the Swiss Institute of Banking and Finance at St. Gallen University
 A fictional character in the movie Lord of War